The Einstein–Hilbert action for general relativity was first formulated purely in terms of the space-time metric. To take the metric and affine connection as independent variables in the action principle was first considered by Palatini. It is called a first order formulation as the variables to vary over involve only up to first derivatives in the action and so doesn't overcomplicate the Euler–Lagrange equations with higher derivative terms. The tetradic Palatini action is another first-order formulation of the Einstein–Hilbert action in terms of a different pair of independent variables, known as frame fields and the spin connection. The use of frame fields and spin connections are essential in the formulation of a generally covariant fermionic action (see the article spin connection for more discussion of this) which couples fermions to gravity when added to the tetradic Palatini action.

Not only is this needed to couple fermions to gravity and makes the tetradic action somehow more fundamental to the metric version, the Palatini action is also a stepping stone to more interesting actions like the self-dual Palatini action which can be seen as the Lagrangian basis for Ashtekar's formulation of canonical gravity (see Ashtekar's variables) or the Holst action which is the basis of the real variables version of Ashtekar's theory. Another important action is the Plebanski action (see the entry on the Barrett–Crane model), and proving that it gives general relativity under certain conditions involves showing it reduces to the Palatini action under these conditions.

Here we present definitions and calculate Einstein's equations from the Palatini action in detail. These calculations can be easily modified for the self-dual Palatini action and the Holst action.

Some definitions 

We first need to introduce the notion of tetrads. A tetrad is an orthonormal vector basis in terms of which the space-time metric looks locally flat,

where  is the Minkowski metric. The tetrads encode the information about the space-time metric and will be taken as one of the independent variables in the action principle.

Now if one is going to operate on objects that have internal indices one needs to introduce an appropriate derivative (covariant derivative). We introduce an arbitrary covariant derivative via

Where  is a spin (Lorentz) connection one-form (the derivative annihilates the Minkowski metric ). We define a curvature via

We obtain

.

We introduce the covariant derivative which annihilates the tetrad,

.

The connection is completely determined by the tetrad. The action of this on the generalized tensor  is given by

We define a curvature  by

This is easily related to the usual curvature defined by

via substituting  into this expression (see below for details). One obtains,

for the Riemann tensor, Ricci tensor and Ricci scalar respectively.

The tetradic Palatini action 

The Ricci scalar of this curvature can be expressed as  The action can be written

where  but now  is a function of the frame field.

We will derive the Einstein equations by varying this action with respect to the tetrad and spin connection as independent quantities.

As a shortcut to performing the calculation we introduce a connection compatible with the tetrad,  The connection associated with this covariant derivative is completely determined by the tetrad. The difference between the two connections we have introduced is a field  defined by

We can compute the difference between the curvatures of these two covariant derivatives (see below for details),

The action becomes

The first term does not depend on  so it does not contribute. The second term is a total derivative. The last term yields 

We show below that this implies that  as the prefactor  is non-degenerate. This tells us that  coincides with  when acting on objects with only internal indices. From the standard formula

we have . Or upon using , this becomes . We compute the second equation  by varying with respect to the tetrad,

which, after multiplication by  just tells us that the Einstein tensor  of the metric defined by the tetrads vanishes. We have therefore proved that the Palatini variation of the action in tetradic form yields the usual Einstein equations.

Generalizations of the Palatini action 

We change the action by adding a term

This modifies the Palatini action to

where

The self dual formulation corresponds to the choice .

It is easy to show these actions give the same equations. However, the case corresponding to  must be done separately (see article self-dual Palatini action). Assume , then  has an inverse given by

(note this diverges for ). As this inverse exists the generalization of the prefactor  will also be non-degenerate and as such equivalent conditions are obtained from variation with respect to the connection. We again obtain . While variation with respect to the tetrad yields Einstein's equation plus an additional term. However, this extra term vanishes by symmetries of the Riemann tensor.

Details of calculation

Relating usual curvature to the mixed index curvature 

The usual Riemann curvature tensor  is defined by

To find the relation to the mixed index curvature tensor let us substitute 

where we have used . Since this is true for all  we obtain

.

Using this expression we find

Difference between curvatures 

The derivative defined by  only knows how to act on internal indices. However, we find it convenient to consider a torsion-free extension to spacetime indices. All calculations will be independent of this choice of extension.

Then

Hence:

Varying the action with respect to the field  

We would expect  to also annihilate the Minkowski metric . If we also assume that the covariant derivative  annihilates the Minkowski metric (then said to be torsion-free) we have,

Implying 

From the last term of the action we have from varying with respect to 

or

or

where we have used . This can be written more compactly as

Vanishing of  

We will show following the reference "Geometrodynamics vs. Connection Dynamics" that

implies  First we define the spacetime tensor field by

Contracting Eq. 1 with  one calculates that

As  we have  We write it as

or

Implying 

 

or

This is the desired result.

See also 

 Lanczos tensor
 Weyl tensor

References

General relativity